<mapframe
text="Cluster of outbuildings associated with Kensington Palace, including Wren House"
width=242
height=242
zoom=18
latitude=51.50594 
longitude=-0.18898/>
Wren House is a house in the grounds of Kensington Palace in London.  Wren House has been occupied by Prince Edward, Duke of Kent, one of Queen Elizabeth II's cousins, since 1978.

When Kensington Palace was made the Royal Residence, architect Christopher Wren was tasked to expand the existing structure.  He added a cluster of cottages that included: Wren House; Ivy Cottage, the home of Princess Eugenie of York; and Nottingham Cottage, the former home of Prince Harry, Duke of Sussex.

References

Christopher Wren buildings in London
Houses in the Royal Borough of Kensington and Chelsea
Kensington Palace
Royal residences in the United Kingdom